Ecprepaulax is a Lower Cretaceous mammal from Portugal. It was a member of the also extinct order Multituberculata and shared the world with dinosaurs. It lies within the suborder "Plagiaulacida" and family Pinheirodontidae.

The genus Ecprepaulax was named by Hahn G. and Hahn R. in 1999 based on a single species Ecprepaulax anomala Fossil remains were found in Berriasian (Lower Cretaceous) strata in Portugal. The species is a multituberculate mammal within the informal suborder of "Plagiaulacida".

References 
Hahn & Hahn (1999), Pinheirodontidae n. fam. (Multituberculata) (Mammalia) aus der tiefen Unter-Kreide Portugals. Palaeontographica A, 253, p. 77-222.
Kielan-Jaworowska Z & Hurum JH (2001), "Phylogeny and Systematics of multituberculate mammals". Paleontology 44, p. 389-429.
Much of this information has been derived from  MESOZOIC MAMMALS: Basal Multituberculata, an Internet directory.

Multituberculates
Early Cretaceous mammals of Europe
Prehistoric mammal genera
Fossil taxa described in 1999